Gordonia villosa is a species of plant in the family Theaceae. It is endemic to Jamaica.

References

villosa
Endangered plants
Endemic flora of Jamaica
Taxonomy articles created by Polbot